Whina or Āwhina is a Māori female given name meaning "helper".

Whina or Āwhina may refer to:
 Dame Whina Cooper, New Zealand Māori activist
 Awhina Tamarapa, New Zealand museum curator 
 Whina (film), a 2022 film depicting Whina Cooper's life